Emeline Jamison Pigott (December 15, 1836 – May 26, 1919) was a spy for the Confederate States of America during the American Civil War. For several years, she hid secret messages in her skirt and carried them between New Bern, North Carolina and local sea ports. She was almost caught several times. Eventually, Union officials arrested her on charges of blockade running, and she was sent back home.

Early life 
Emeline Pigott was born on December 15, 1836, in Harlowe Township, Carteret County, North Carolina. She was the daughter of Colonel Levi Whitehurst Pigott and Elizabeth Dennis. She grew up in Harlowe and when she was 25, she moved with her family to Crab Point, near present-day Morehead City, North Carolina.

Civil War 
Just across Calico Creek from the Pigott's farm there was an encampment of Confederate soldiers from the 26th North Carolina Infantry, who were stationed there to protect the North Carolina coast. Emeline helped sick and wounded Confederate soldiers by nursing them and providing food and supplies. She collected mail from the soldiers and would also sneak medical supplies, food, and clothing into the nearby woods and hide them in hollow trees designated especially for this purpose. During these activities, Pigott met and fell in love with a private by the name of Stokes McRae. Stokes was born to a wealthy farm family in Montgomery County, North Carolina. He attended and graduated from the University of North Carolina but led a life of idleness until he felt that he was called to fight in the Civil War. McRae and his regiment were sent north to Virginia and took part in the Battle of New Bern.

Emeline followed the men of the 26th North Carolina to New Bern, North Carolina, hoping to be of some help. New Bern fell to the Federals after only four hours of fighting. She remained in New Bern until the last train carrying Confederate wounded to Kinston. She remained there for several months nursing the wounded.

The 26th North Carolina fought in Virginia, and then returned to eastern North Carolina to protect the Confederate capital of Richmond, Virginia. In May 1863, the regiment was attached to the Army of Northern Virginia and headed north. On July 1, the regiment took part in the Battle of Gettysburg. McRae, then a sergeant major, was hospitalized with a shattered thigh. He died on August 2, 1863.

In December 1863, Emmeline made her way to Concord, North Carolina when the Federals took Kinston. She finally worked her way back down to the coast and her home near Morehead City.

Spying on the North 
Emeline organized fishermen to spy for her and she passed this information to the Confederate authorities. Emeline also entertained Yankee soldiers at her parents' farm, distracting them long enough for her brother-in-law, Rufus Bell, to carry food into the nearby woods for Confederates hiding there. Rufus was the husband of Emmeline's sister, Abigail.  

In 1864, Emmeline and Rufus were arrested on suspicion of spying while trying to carry supplies and messages across the lines. Rufus was searched and released when no contraband was found on him. While the police were looking for a woman to search Emeline, she swallowed some of the incriminating messages and tore others into tiny pieces. However, she was found to be concealing about 30 pounds of contraband in her voluminous skirts. Secured in specially sewn pockets in her skirts and petticoats were discovered: 1 pair boots, 2 pairs of pants, a shirt, a cap, a dozen linen collars, 12 hankies, 50 skeins of wool, needles, a lot of spools of thread, toothbrushes, hair combs, 3 pocket knives, several pairs of gloves, razors, and 4-5 pounds of candy. The carriage in which they were arrested is on display at the History Museum of Carteret County, North Carolina.

Trial
Emmeline was transported to New Bern to stand trial. She was allowed to take her cousin, Mrs. Levi Woodburg Pigott, with her. They were imprisoned in a home in New Bern. The home still stands and is used as a gift shop for the nearby Tryon Palace complex, distinguished with a historical marker. One night, the women claimed someone tried to kill them with chloroform, but they broke a window in their room and took turns breathing fresh air until they were able to summon the guards' attention.

Over the next month, Emmeline was scheduled for trial on several occasions, but never went to a hearing. She was unexpectedly released from her incarceration and returned home. After her release, Federal soldiers constantly harassed her until the Civil War ended..

Later life 
Emmeline was a member of the New Bern Chapter of the United Daughters of the Confederacy and in her later years organized a chapter in Morehead City. It was named for her and she held the title of honorary president until her death on May 26, 1919 at the age of 82.

Emmeline is buried in the Pigott family graveyard on the north shore of Calico Creek just off of what is now 20th Street and Emmeline Place in Morehead City. The graveyard is cared for by the city, but is padlocked. Her headstone can be seen from the padlocked gate.

Legacy 
A play about her life, Bonnie Blue Sweetheart was written and performed.

References

Further reading 

 Canon, Jill. (2000). Civil War Heroines. Santa Barbara: Bellerphon Books. .
 Kent, Scotti; Cohn, Scotti. (2000). More Than Petticoats: Remarkable North Carolina Women.  TwoDot Publishing. .

External links 
 
 Emeline Jamison Pigott: A Confederate Heroine, The North Carolina Civil War and Reconstruction History Center

1836 births
1919 deaths
People from Morehead City, North Carolina
Female wartime spies
Women in the American Civil War
American Civil War spies